is a Japanese footballer currently playing as a midfielder for Grazer AK.

Career statistics

Club
.

Notes

References

1999 births
Living people
Sportspeople from Fukuoka Prefecture
Association football people from Fukuoka Prefecture
Japanese footballers
Japanese expatriate footballers
Association football midfielders
2. Liga (Austria) players
Kyoto Sanga FC players
FC Wacker Innsbruck (2002) players
Japanese expatriate sportspeople in Austria
Expatriate footballers in Austria